Richard Charles Lintern (born 8 October 1962) is an English stage, voice and screen actor.

Early life
Lintern was born in Taunton, Somerset. He studied English Literature at Durham University. He subsequently won a scholarship to the Royal Academy of Dramatic Art.

Career
Lintern has an extensive stage career, spending most professional time in the West End and the Royal National Theatre.
He has appeared across the UK, including roles at the Royal National Theatre, the Royal Shakespeare Company, the Royal Court Theatre The Merchant of Venice at the West Yorkshire Playhouse and Hamlet at the Bristol Old Vic. As well as many TV shows, including Lead Balloon, Screenplay, The Beggar Bride, Covington Cross, Midsomer Murders "Picture of Innocence", Cadfael, Lewis, She's Out, Demob, The Storyteller, Victoria Wood, The Line of Beauty, Forever Green, The Good Guys, The Bill, Casualty, Plotlands, Heartbeat, Performance, Holding the Baby, Bloodlines, which is loosely based on the life and disappearance of Lord Lucan, Taggart, The Inspector Lynley Mysteries and Agatha Christie's Poirot "Dead Man's Mirror" and "Mrs.McGinty's Dead".

Lintern played a young Muhammad Ali Jinnah in the 1998 film Jinnah, and an American police officer in the 1998 film Lost Souls. In 2003, Lintern also played the leading Pharisee in the word for word Bible film The Gospel of John. He also starred in the 2007 gay drama film by Channel 4 Clapham Junction, where he played Will, who is entering a civil partnership. He was also in The Bank Job in 2008 playing an MI5 officer ordered to retrieve the embarrassing proceeds of a bank robbery in 1970s London. Other films include Syriana, Page Eight, Malaventura, and The Calling. Lintern also appeared in the third series of the television drama, The House of Eliott. In 2011 he appeared in the BBC series The Shadow Line, and in 2012 in Hunted for BBC One and HBO. He played Hector Stokes. He played Thomas Chamberlain, the head of the Lyell Centre in The BBC series Silent Witness. Lintern departed Silent Witness on 5 February 2020, after 7 years.

Lintern has played two different characters in Heartbeat. The first was in the episode Love's Sweet Dream, in which he played Ray Richards, a violent and abusive husband. He was later cast as Ben Norton, estate manager to Lord Ashfordly, who marries the village doctor.

Richard Lintern is also a voice-over artist, having voiced commercials for Gillette, Ferrero Rocher, Mercedes and Film4. He is the narrator of a number of documentary series including the BAFTA-winning Between Life and Death.

Personal life
Lintern is married and has three sons. The family lives in London and Somerset.

Filmography

References

External links

Living people
1962 births
20th-century English male actors
21st-century English male actors
Alumni of Van Mildert College, Durham
Alumni of RADA
Male actors from Somerset
People from Taunton
English male film actors
English male television actors
English male voice actors